Route 154 is a highway in northeastern Missouri.  Its eastern terminus is at U.S. Route 54 north of Vandalia; its western terminus is at U.S. Route 24) west of Paris, where Business US 24 also has its western terminus.  Route 154 passes through Mark Twain State Park and over Mark Twain Lake.

Route 154 between Paris and Perry was part of Route 54, which continued east to New London, until 1926 or 1927, when it was renumbered Route 26 because of US 54. The part east of Perry became an extension of Route 19 in about 1930, and the rest was renumbered Route 154 by 1946.

Route description

History

Major intersections

References

154
Transportation in Monroe County, Missouri
Transportation in Audrain County, Missouri
Transportation in Ralls County, Missouri